Laurenţiu Florea (born 20 February 1981 in Medgidia, Constanța County) is a Romanian professional footballer. He currently plays for Callatis Mangalia.

External links
 
 
 

1981 births
Living people
People from Medgidia
Romanian footballers
FCV Farul Constanța players
Association football defenders
FC Politehnica Iași (2010) players